Hanky Panky is a 1982 American comedy thriller Metrocolor film directed by Sidney Poitier, starring Gene Wilder and Gilda Radner. Wilder and Radner met during filming and later married.

Plot
Michael Jordon, an architect, accidentally becomes involved in a web of intrigue and murder when a strange woman, who enters a taxi with him, is later found murdered. As a result, he flees from false murder charges. Kate is a woman out to find her brother's killer. Although she and Michael initially believe the other is a killer, they realize otherwise and become a team. They undertake a wild cross-country ride from New York City to the Grand Canyon.

Cast

Production
The film was developed as a follow-up to the successful Gene Wilder-Richard Pryor film Stir Crazy. However, Pryor chose not to participate and Gilda Radner was brought in as a replacement, with her part rewritten.

Reception
Vincent Canby, writing in The New York Times, gave the film a mixed review, saying it "is apt to leave you far less exhilarated than exhausted."

Novelization
A $2.50 paperback novelization of the screenplay was published by Pinnacle Books, somewhat in advance of the film's release (as was the custom of the era). The byline is Leslie Jarreau, which—as there are no other works in existence with that authorship—is possibly a pseudonym (novelization assignments, then as now, rarely went to previously unpublished writers, unless they were somehow connected to the film in question). An accurate record, one way or the other, would seem to be lost.

References

External links
 Hanky Panky at Google
 
 
 
 
 
 

1982 films
1980s chase films
1980s comedy thriller films
1980s crime comedy films
American chase films
American comedy thriller films
American crime comedy films
American road movies
Columbia Pictures films
Comedy mystery films
1980s English-language films
Films directed by Sidney Poitier
Films scored by Tom Scott
Films set in 1981
Films set in Arizona
Films set in Boston
Films set in Maine
Films set in New York City
Films shot in Boston
Films shot in Massachusetts
Films shot in New York City
1982 comedy films
1980s American films